Miss Indonesia 2016 is the 12th edition of the Miss Indonesia pageant. It was held on February 24, 2016, at Studio 14th RCTI, Kebon Jeruk, Jakarta, Indonesia. Miss World 2015, Mireia Lalaguna of Spain attended the awarding night.

Maria Harfanti as Miss Indonesia 2015 from Yogyakarta Special Region crowned her successor, Natasha Mannuela Halim from Bangka-Belitung Islands. She represented Indonesia in Miss World 2016.

Judges 

 Liliana Tanoesoedibjo, founder and chairwoman of Miss Indonesia Organization.
 Peter F. Saerang, professional make-up and hairstylist.
 Noor Sabah Nael Traavik, wife of the ambassador of Norway to Indonesia.
 Wulan Tilaar Widarto, vice-chairwoman of Martha Tilaar Group.
 Ferry Salim, actor, entrepreneur, and ambassador of UNICEF to Indonesia.

Result

Placements

Fast Track Event
Fast track events held during preliminary round and the winners of Fast Track events are automatically qualified to enter the semifinal round. This year's fast track events include : Talent, Catwalk (Modeling), Sports, Nature and Beauty Fashion, Social Media, And Beauty with a Purpose.

Special Awards

Contestants 
Contestants of Miss Indonesia 2016 from 34 Provinces in Indonesia.

References

External links 
 Official site

2016 beauty pageants
Miss Indonesia